Evolution is the seventh studio album by Detroit hip hop group Slum Village. The album was released on June 25, 2013, by Ne'Astra Music and Traffic Entertainment Group. The album features guest appearances from Havoc, Focus..., J. Ivy, DJ Jazzy Jeff, Big Pooh and Blu.

Track listing

Personnel
 Young RJ - production, mixing
 Focus... - production, mixing, keyboards
 Drey Skonie - background vocals
 Kamron Corvet - background vocals
 Ken - guitar
 Larry Tucker - drum fills

References

2013 albums
Slum Village albums